The 2017–18 Washington Capitals season was the 43rd season for the National Hockey League franchise that was established on June 11, 1974. They played their home games at Capital One Arena in Washington, D.C. They were led by head coach Barry Trotz in his fourth season as coach of the Capitals. The Capitals won their first Stanley Cup in organization history, defeating the inaugural-season Vegas Golden Knights in the Stanley Cup Finals.

The team finished the regular season with 105 points, winning the Metropolitan Division for the third year in a row. In the Stanley Cup Playoffs, they lost the first two games of their first round series against the Columbus Blue Jackets before winning the next four games to advance to the Conference Semi-finals against the two-time defending Stanley Cup champion Pittsburgh Penguins, who ended the Capitals' playoffs each of the previous two years. The Capitals defeated the Penguins in six games to advance the Eastern Conference Finals, their first trip to a conference championship series since 1998. The Capitals defeated the Tampa Bay Lightning in the Eastern Conference Finals in seven games, after overcoming a 3-2 series deficit following a Game 5 loss for the first time in franchise history, with goaltender Braden Holtby posting shutouts in both Games 6 and 7 in the process, to earn their first trip to the Stanley Cup Finals since 1998, when they were swept by the Detroit Red Wings. The Capitals faced the first-year Vegas Golden Knights and defeated them in five games to earn the organization's first ever Stanley Cup, while becoming the 100th Stanley Cup champions since 1914. Alexander Ovechkin was awarded the Conn Smythe Trophy as the MVP of the playoffs.

Standings

Schedule and results

Preseason
The Capitals' preseason schedule was released on June 7, 2017.

|- style="background:#fcc;"
| 1 || September 18 || @ New Jersey Devils || 1–4 || 0–1–0
|- style="background:#cfc;"
| 2 || September 20 || @ Montreal Canadiens || 4–2 || 1–1–0
|- style="background:#fcc;"
| 3 || September 22 || St. Louis Blues || 0–4 || 1–2–0
|- style="background:#fcc;"
| 4 || September 23 || Carolina Hurricanes || 1–4 || 1–3–0
|- style="background:#fcc;"
| 5 || September 27 || New Jersey Devils || 1–4 || 1–4–0
|- style="background:#fcc;"
| 6 || September 29 || @ Carolina Hurricanes || 1–3 || 1–5–0
|- style="background:#cfc;"
| 7 || October 1 || @ St. Louis Blues || 4–3 || 2–5–0
|-

Regular season
The team released its regular season schedule on June 22, 2017.

|- style="background:#cfc;"
| 1 || October 5 || @ Ottawa || 5–4 || SO || Holtby || Canadian Tire Centre || 17,009 || 1–0–0 || 2 || Recap
|- style="background:#cfc;"
| 2 || October 7 || Montreal || 6–1 ||  || Holtby || Capital One Arena || 18,506 || 2–0–0 || 4 || Recap
|- style="background:#fff;"
| 3 || October 9 || @ Tampa Bay || 3–4 || OT || Grubauer || Amalie Arena || 19,092 || 2–0–1 || 5 || Recap
|- style="background:#fcc;"
| 4 || October 11 || Pittsburgh || 2–3 ||  || Holtby || Capital One Arena || 18,506 || 2–1–1 || 5 || Recap
|- style="background:#cfc;"
| 5 || October 13 || @ New Jersey || 5–2 ||  || Holtby || Prudential Center || 13,458 || 3–1–1 || 7 || Recap
|- style="background:#fcc;"
| 6 || October 14 || @ Philadelphia || 2–8 ||  || Grubauer || Wells Fargo Center || 19,817 || 3–2–1 || 7 || Recap
|- style="background:#fcc;"
| 7 || October 17 || Toronto || 0–2 ||  || Holtby || Capital One Arena || 18,506 || 3–3–1 || 7 ||  Recap
|- style="background:#cfc;"
| 8 || October 20 || @ Detroit || 4–3 || OT || Holtby || Little Caesars Arena || 19,515 || 4–3–1 || 9 || Recap
|- style="background:#fcc;"
| 9 || October 21 || Florida || 1–4 ||  || Grubauer || Capital One Arena || 18,506 || 4–4–1 || 9 || Recap
|- style="background:#fcc;"
| 10 || October 26 || @ Vancouver || 2–6 ||  || Holtby || Rogers Arena || 18,293 || 4–5–1 || 9 || Recap
|- style="background:#cfc;"
| 11 || October 28 || @ Edmonton || 5–2 ||  || Holtby || Rogers Place || 18,347 || 5–5–1 || 11 || Recap
|- style="background:#fcc;"
| 12 || October 29 || @ Calgary || 1–2 ||  || Grubauer || Scotiabank Saddledome || 18,327 || 5–6–1 || 11 || Recap
|-

|- style="background:#cfc;"
| 13 || November 2 || NY Islanders || 4–3 ||  || Holtby || Capital One Arena || 18,506 || 6–6–1 || 13 || Recap
|- style="background:#cfc;"
| 14 || November 4 || @ Boston || 3–2 ||  || Holtby || TD Garden || 17,565 || 7–6–1 || 15 || Recap
|- style="background:#cfc;"
| 15 || November 6 || Arizona || 3–2 || OT || Holtby || Capital One Arena || 18,506 || 8–6–1 || 17 || Recap
|- style="background:#fcc;"
| 16 || November 7 || @ Buffalo || 1–3 ||  || Grubauer || KeyBank Center || 17,146 || 8–7–1 || 17 || Recap
|- style="background:#cfc;"
| 17 || November 10 || Pittsburgh || 4–1 ||  || Holtby || Capital One Arena || 18,506 || 9–7–1 || 19 || Recap
|- style="background:#cfc;"
| 18 || November 12 || Edmonton || 2–1 || SO || Holtby || Capital One Arena || 18,506 || 10–7–1 || 21 || Recap
|- style="background:#fcc;"
| 19 || November 14 || @ Nashville || 3–6 ||  || Holtby || Bridgestone Arena || 17,113 || 10–8–1 || 21 || Recap
|- style="background:#fcc;"
| 20 || November 16 || @ Colorado || 2–6 ||  || Grubauer || Pepsi Center || 15,070 || 10–9–1 || 21 || Recap
|- style="background:#cfc;"
| 21 || November 18 || Minnesota || 3–1 ||  || Holtby || Capital One Arena || 18,506 || 11–9–1 || 23 || Recap
|- style="background:#fcc;"
| 22 || November 20 || Calgary || 1–4 ||  || Holtby || Capital One Arena || 18,506 || 11–10–1 || 23 || Recap
|- style="background:#cfc;"
| 23 || November 22 || Ottawa || 5–2 ||  || Holtby || Capital One Arena || 18,506 || 12–10–1 || 25 || Recap
|- style="background:#cfc;"
| 24 || November 24 || Tampa Bay || 3–1 ||  || Grubauer || Capital One Arena || 18,506 || 13–10–1 || 27 || Recap
|- style="background:#cfc;"
| 25 || November 25 || @ Toronto || 4–2 ||  || Holtby || Air Canada Centre || 19,404 || 14–10–1 || 29 || Recap
|- style="background:#fcc;"
| 26 || November 30 || Los Angeles || 2–5 ||  || Holtby || Capital One Arena || 18,506 || 14–11–1 || 29 || Recap
|-

|- style="background:#cfc;"
| 27 || December 2 || Columbus || 4–3 ||  || Holtby || Capital One Arena || 18,506 || 15–11–1 || 31 || Recap
|- style="background:#cfc;"
| 28 || December 4 || San Jose || 4–1 ||  || Grubauer || Capital One Arena || 18,506 || 16–11–1 || 33 || Recap
|- style="background:#cfc;"
| 29 || December 6 || Chicago || 6–2 ||  || Holtby || Capital One Arena || 18,506 || 17–11–1 || 35 || Recap
|- style="background:#cfc;"
| 30 || December 8 || NY Rangers || 4–2 ||  || Holtby || Capital One Arena || 18,506 || 18–11–1 || 37 || Recap
|- style="background:#fcc;"
| 31 || December 11 || @ NY Islanders || 1–3 ||  || Holtby || Barclays Center || 11,053 || 18–12–1 || 37 || Recap
|- style="background:#cfc;"
| 32 || December 12 || Colorado || 5–2 ||  || Holtby || Capital One Arena || 18,506 || 19–12–1 || 39 || Recap
|- style="background:#cfc;"
| 33 || December 14 || @ Boston || 5–3 ||  || Holtby || TD Garden || 17,565 || 20–12–1 || 41 ||  Recap
|- style="background:#cfc;"
| 34 || December 16 || Anaheim || 3–2 || OT || Holtby || Capital One Arena || 18,506 || 21–12–1 || 43 || Recap
|- style="background:#cfc;"
| 35 || December 19 || @ Dallas || 4–3 || OT || Holtby || American Airlines Center || 18,112 || 22–12–1 || 45 || Recap
|- style="background:#fff;"
| 36 || December 22 || @ Arizona || 2–3 || OT || Grubauer || Gila River Arena || 10,904 || 22–12–2 || 46 || Recap
|- style="background:#fcc;"
| 37 || December 23 || @ Vegas || 0–3 ||  || Holtby || T-Mobile Arena || 18,025 || 22–13–2 || 46 || Recap
|- style="background:#fff;"
| 38 || December 27 || @ NY Rangers || 0–1 || SO || Grubauer || Madison Square Garden || 18,006 || 22–13–3 || 47 || Recap
|- style="background:#cfc;"
| 39 || December 28 || Boston || 4–3 || SO || Holtby || Capital One Arena || 18,506 || 23–13–3 || 49 || Recap
|- style="background:#cfc;"
| 40 || December 30 || New Jersey || 5–2 ||  || Holtby || Capital One Arena || 18,506 || 24–13–3 || 51 || Recap
|-

|- style="background:#cfc;"
| 41 || January 2 || @ Carolina || 5–4 || OT || Holtby || PNC Arena || 11,989 || 25–13–3 || 53 || Recap
|- style="background:#cfc;"
| 42 || January 7 || St. Louis || 4–3 || OT || Holtby || Capital One Arena || 18,506 || 26–13–3 || 55 || Recap
|- style="background:#cfc;"
| 43 || January 9 || Vancouver || 3–1 ||  || Grubauer || Capital One Arena || 18,506 || 27–13–3 || 57 || Recap
|- style="background:#fcc;"
| 44 || January 11 || Carolina || 1–3 ||  || Holtby || Capital One Arena || 18,506 || 27–14–3 || 57 || Recap
|- style="background:#cfc;"
| 45 || January 12 || @ Carolina || 4–3 ||  || Grubauer || PNC Arena || 16,239 || 28–14–3 || 59 || Recap
|- style="background:#fff;"
| 46 || January 18 || @ New Jersey || 3–4 || OT || Holtby || Prudential Center || 14,163 || 28–14–4 || 60 || Recap
|- style="background:#fcc;"
| 47 || January 19 || Montreal || 2–3 ||  || Grubauer || Capital One Arena || 18,506 || 28–15–4 || 60 || Recap
|- style="background:#fff;"
| 48 || January 21 || Philadelphia || 1–2 || OT || Holtby || Capital One Arena || 18,506 || 28–15–5 || 61 || Recap
|- style="background:#cfc;"
| 49 || January 25 || @ Florida || 4–2 ||  || Holtby || BB&T Center || 14,033 || 29–15–5 || 63 || Recap
|- style="background:#cfc;"
| 50 || January 31 || Philadelphia || 5–3 ||  || Holtby || Capital One Arena || 18,506 || 30–15–5 || 65 || Recap
|-

|- style="background:#fcc;"
| 51 || February 2 || @ Pittsburgh || 4–7 ||  || Holtby || PPG Paints Arena || 18,652 || 30–16–5 || 65 || Recap
|- style="background:#fcc;"
| 52 || February 4 || Vegas || 3–4 ||  || Grubauer || Capital One Arena || 18,506 || 30–17–5 || 65 || Recap
|- style="background:#cfc;"
| 53 || February 6 || @ Columbus || 3–2 ||  || Holtby || Nationwide Arena || 16,419 || 31–17–5 || 67 || Recap
|- style="background:#cfc;"
| 54 || February 9 || Columbus || 4–2 ||  || Holtby || Capital One Arena || 18,506 || 32–17–5 || 69 || Recap
|- style="background:#fff;"
| 55 || February 11 || Detroit || 4–5 || OT || Holtby || Capital One Arena || 18,506 || 32–17–6 || 70 || Recap
|- style="background:#fff;"
| 56 || February 13 || @ Winnipeg || 3–4 || OT || Holtby || Bell MTS Place || 15,321 || 32–17–7 || 71 || Recap
|- style="background:#cfc;"
| 57 || February 15 || @ Minnesota || 5–2 ||  || Grubauer || Xcel Energy Center || 19,027 || 33–17–7 || 73 || Recap
|- style="background:#fcc;"
| 58 || February 17 || @ Chicago || 1–7 ||  || Holtby || United Center || 22,066 || 33–18–7 || 73 || Recap
|- style="background:#cfc;"
| 59 || February 19 || @ Buffalo || 3–2 ||  || Grubauer || KeyBank Center || 18,228 || 34–18–7 || 75 || Recap
|- style="background:#fcc;"
| 60 || February 20 || Tampa Bay || 2–4 ||  || Holtby || Capital One Arena || 18,506 || 34–19–7 || 75 || Recap
|- style="background:#fcc;"
| 61 || February 22 || @ Florida || 2–3 ||  || Holtby || BB&T Center || 15,312 || 34–20–7 || 75 || Recap
|- style="background:#cfc;"
| 62 || February 24 || Buffalo || 5–1 ||  || Grubauer || Capital One Arena || 18,506 || 35–20–7 || 77 || Recap
|- style="background:#fcc;"
| 63 || February 26 || @ Columbus || 1–5 ||  || Holtby || Nationwide Arena || 17,386 || 35–21–7 || 77 || Recap
|- style="background:#cfc;"
| 64 || February 27 || Ottawa || 3–2 ||  || Grubauer || Capital One Arena || 18,506 || 36–21–7 || 79 || Recap
|-

|- style="background:#cfc;"
| 65 || March 3 || Toronto || 5–2 ||  || Holtby || Navy–Marine Corps Memorial Stadium || 29,516(outdoors) || 37–21–7 || 81 || Recap
|- style="background:#fcc;"
| 66 || March 6 || @ Anaheim || 0–4 ||  || Holtby || Honda Center || 15,910 || 37–22–7 || 81 || Recap
|- style="background:#fcc;"
| 67 || March 8 || @ Los Angeles || 1–3 ||  || Grubauer || Staples Center || 18,230 || 37–23–7 || 81 || Recap
|- style="background:#cfc;"
| 68 || March 10 || @ San Jose || 2–0 ||  || Grubauer || SAP Center || 17,562 || 38–23–7 || 83 || Recap
|- style="background:#cfc;"
| 69 || March 12 || Winnipeg || 3–2 || OT || Grubauer || Capital One Arena || 18,506 || 39–23–7 || 85 || Recap
|- style="background:#cfc;"
| 70 || March 15 || @ NY Islanders || 7–3 ||  || Grubauer || Barclays Center || 10,740 || 40–23–7 || 87 || Recap
|- style="background:#cfc;"
| 71 || March 16 || NY Islanders || 6–3 ||  || Holtby || Capital One Arena || 18,506 || 41–23–7 || 89 || Recap
|- style="background:#fcc;"
| 72 || March 18 || @ Philadelphia || 3–6 ||  || Grubauer || Wells Fargo Center || 19,687 || 41–24–7 || 89 || Recap
|- style="background:#cfc;"
| 73 || March 20 || Dallas || 4–3 ||  || Holtby || Capital One Arena || 18,506 || 42–24–7 || 91 || Recap
|- style="background:#cfc;"
| 74 || March 22 || @ Detroit || 1–0 ||  || Grubauer || Little Caesars Arena || 19,515 || 43–24–7 || 93 || Recap
|- style="background:#cfc;"
| 75 || March 24 || @ Montreal || 6–4 ||  || Grubauer || Bell Centre || 21,302 || 44–24–7 || 95 || Recap
|- style="background:#cfc;"
| 76 || March 26 || @ NY Rangers || 4–2 ||  || Grubauer || Madison Square Garden || 18,006 || 45–24–7 || 97 || Recap
|- style="background:#cfc;"
| 77 || March 28 || NY Rangers || 3–2 || OT || Holtby || Capital One Arena || 18,506 || 46–24–7 || 99 || Recap
|- style="background:#fcc;"
| 78 || March 30 || Carolina || 1–4 ||  || Holtby || Capital One Arena || 18,506 || 46–25–7 || 99 || Recap
|-

|- style="background:#cfc;"
| 79 || April 1 || @ Pittsburgh || 3–1 ||  || Grubauer || PPG Paints Arena || 18,639 || 47–25–7 || 101 || Recap
|- style="background:#cfc;"
| 80 || April 2 || @ St. Louis || 4–2 ||  || Holtby || Scottrade Center || 18,841 || 48–25–7 || 103 || Recap
|- style="background:#fcc;"
| 81 || April 5 || Nashville || 3–4 ||  || Grubauer || Capital One Arena || 18,506 || 48–26–7 || 103 || Recap
|- style="background:#cfc;"
| 82 || April 7 || New Jersey || 5–3 ||  || Holtby || Capital One Arena || 18,506 || 49–26–7 || 105 || Recap
|-

|-
|

Playoffs

The Capitals endured hardships during their first successful Stanley Cup run through 24 games, and simultaneously became the second Stanley Cup champion to trail at least once in all four playoff rounds (1990–91 Pittsburgh Penguins) and the fourth to drop the first two games of the first series at home (2001–02 Detroit Red Wings, 2005-06 Carolina Hurricanes, and 2010–11 Boston Bruins). This also makes such run the third-longest Stanley Cup run, tied with four other runs.

|- style="background:#fcc;"
| 1 || April 12 || Columbus || 3–4 || OT || Grubauer || Capital One Arena || 18,506 || 0–1 || Recap
|- style="background:#fcc;"
| 2 || April 15 || Columbus || 4–5 || OT || Holtby || Capital One Arena || 18,506 || 0–2 || Recap
|- style="background:#cfc;"
| 3 || April 17 || @ Columbus || 3–2 || 2OT || Holtby || Nationwide Arena || 19,337 || 1–2 || Recap
|- style="background:#cfc;"
| 4 || April 19 || @ Columbus || 4–1 ||  || Holtby || Nationwide Arena || 19,395 || 2–2 || Recap
|- style="background:#cfc;"
| 5 || April 21 || Columbus || 4–3 || OT || Holtby || Capital One Arena || 18,506 || 3–2 || Recap
|- style="background:#cfc;"
| 6 || April 23 || @ Columbus || 6–3 ||  || Holtby || Nationwide Arena || 18,667 || 4–2 || Recap
|-

|- style="background:#fcc;"
| 1 || April 26 || Pittsburgh || 2–3 ||  || Holtby || Capital One Arena || 18,506 || 0–1 || Recap
|- style="background:#cfc;"
| 2 || April 29 || Pittsburgh || 4–1 ||  || Holtby || Capital One Arena || 18,506 || 1–1 || Recap
|- style="background:#cfc;"
| 3 || May 1 || @ Pittsburgh || 4–3 ||  || Holtby || PPG Paints Arena || 18,634 || 2–1 || Recap
|- style="background:#fcc;"
| 4 || May 3 || @ Pittsburgh || 1–3 ||  || Holtby || PPG Paints Arena || 18,650 || 2–2 || Recap
|- style="background:#cfc;"
| 5 || May 5 || Pittsburgh || 6–3 ||  || Holtby || Capital One Arena || 18,506 || 3–2 || Recap
|- style="background:#cfc;"
| 6 || May 7 || @ Pittsburgh || 2–1 || OT || Holtby || PPG Paints Arena || 18,621 || 4–2 || Recap
|-

|- style="background:#cfc;"
| 1 || May 11 || @ Tampa Bay || 4–2 ||  || Holtby || Amalie Arena || 19,092 || 1–0 || Recap
|- style="background:#cfc;"
| 2 || May 13 || @ Tampa Bay || 6–2 ||  || Holtby || Amalie Arena || 19,092 || 2–0 || Recap
|- style="background:#fcc;"
| 3 || May 15 || Tampa Bay || 2–4 ||  || Holtby || Capital One Arena || 18,506 || 2–1 || Recap
|- style="background:#fcc;"
| 4 || May 17 || Tampa Bay || 2–4 ||  || Holtby || Capital One Arena || 18,506 || 2–2 || Recap
|- style="background:#fcc;"
| 5 || May 19 || @ Tampa Bay || 2–3 ||  || Holtby || Amalie Arena || 19,092 || 2–3 || Recap
|- style="background:#cfc;"
| 6 || May 21 || Tampa Bay || 3–0 ||  || Holtby || Capital One Arena || 18,506 || 3–3 || Recap
|- style="background:#cfc;"
| 7 || May 23 || @ Tampa Bay || 4–0 ||  || Holtby || Amalie Arena || 19,092 || 4–3 || Recap
|-

|- style="background:#fcc;"
| 1 || May 28 || @ Vegas || 4–6 ||  || Holtby || T-Mobile Arena || 18,575 || 0–1 || Recap
|- style="background:#cfc;"
| 2 || May 30 || @ Vegas || 3–2 ||  || Holtby || T-Mobile Arena || 18,702 || 1–1 || Recap
|- style="background:#cfc;"
| 3 || June 2 || Vegas || 3–1 ||  || Holtby || Capital One Arena || 18,506 || 2–1 || Recap
|- style="background:#cfc;"
| 4 || June 4 || Vegas || 6–2 ||  || Holtby || Capital One Arena || 18,506 || 3–1 || Recap
|- style="background:#cfc;"
| 5 || June 7 || @ Vegas || 4–3 ||  || Holtby || T-Mobile Arena || 18,529 || 4–1 || Recap
|-

|-
|

Player statistics
Final Stats
Skaters

Goaltenders

†Denotes player spent time with another team before joining the Capitals. Statistics reflect time with the Capitals only.
‡Denotes player was traded mid-season. Statistics reflect time with the Capitals only.

Transactions
The Capitals have been involved in the following transactions during the 2017–18 season.

Trades

Free agents acquired

Free agents lost

Claimed via waivers

Lost via waivers

Players released

Lost via retirement

Player signings

Draft picks

Below are the Washington Capitals' selections at the 2017 NHL Entry Draft, which was held on June 23 and 24, 2017 at the United Center in Chicago.

References

Washington Capitals seasons
Washington Capitals
Washing
Washing
Eastern Conference (NHL) championship seasons
Washington
Stanley Cup championship seasons